SS British Consul was a tanker built by Sir James Laing & Sons Ltd., Sunderland in 1924 and operated by the British Tanker Company.

Propulsion
British Consul was a steamship. These fed steam to her three-cylinder triple-expansion steam engine, which was built by Palmers Shipbuilding and Iron Company.

First sinking
On the night of 18–19 February 1942 the ship was anchored in Port of Spain, Trinidad. She had been due to sail at midnight but submarines had been reported outside the port. The Royal Navy granted her Master, Captain G.A. Dickson, permission to defer sailing until 0400 hrs. as his crew would have a better chance of sighting submarines in daylight. Kapitänleutnant Albrecht Achilles of  reported that he fired two stern-launched torpedoes into Port of Spain anchorage at 0532 hrs. and that one of these struck British Consul. Captain Dickson reports that the torpedo struck her "between the pumproom and the poop, starting a fire". All hands got away in the lifeboats and stood by under the bow. She sank in shallow water so the crew reboarded her.

Second sinking
In August 1942 British Consul, now commanded by Captain James Kennedy, joined Convoy TAW(S) from Trinidad via Curaçao to Key West. Kapitänleutnant Reinhard Suhren of  reported that on the morning of 19 August 1942 he attacked the convoy and hit three ships including British Consul. Second Engineer Edwin John Angell, (who had been imprisoned below decks aboard the Admiral Graf Spee during the Battle of the River Plate) was lost. This time British Consul could not be recovered.

Replacement ship
A replacement ship of the same name was launched on 2 March 1950 at Harland and Wolff's Glasgow shipyard. At 8,655 gross tons the new British Consul was significantly larger than the original 1924 tanker.

References

Sources
Letter from James Baillie at Grangemouth to Captain Waters, 2 May 1942

Ships sunk by German submarines in World War II
Steamships of the United Kingdom
World War II shipwrecks in the Atlantic Ocean
Ships built on the River Wear
World War II merchant ships of the United Kingdom
1922 ships
Maritime incidents in February 1942
Ships of BP Shipping
Anglo-Persian Oil Company
Maritime incidents in August 1942